J. Kurtz and Sons Store Building is a historic commercial building in the Jamaica neighborhood of Queens in New York City.  It was built in 1931 and is a six-story, steel-frame building with two decorated sides in the Art Deco style. It is three bays by six bays and features a metal-framed windows with stepped pylon motif rising through all four floors. They are of cast aluminum with geometric designs.  It was built to house a franchise of the J. Kurtz and Sons furniture store, founded by Jacob Kurtz in 1870.

It was designated as a New York City Landmark in 1981, and listed on the National Register of Historic Places in 1983. Today it is a local The Children's Place franchise, as well as other local shops and an office for the New York City Department of Probation.

See also
List of New York City Designated Landmarks in Queens
National Register of Historic Places listings in Queens County, New York

References

Art Deco architecture in Queens, New York
Commercial buildings completed in 1931
Commercial buildings in Queens, New York
Commercial buildings on the National Register of Historic Places in New York City
Jamaica, Queens
National Register of Historic Places in Queens, New York
New York City Designated Landmarks in Queens, New York